The Spences Bridge Group is a 100-million-year-old volcanic group of the southern Intermontane Belt in British Columbia, Canada. It consists of two stratigraphic units called the Pimainus Formation and the Spius Formation. The Spius Formation represents a shield volcano whereas the underlying Pimainus Formation is interpreted to be a set of stratovolcanoes.

See also
Volcanism of Canada
Volcanism of Western Canada

References

Volcanism of British Columbia
Cretaceous volcanism
Volcanic groups
Stratigraphy of British Columbia
Thompson Country